Sparaxis is a genus of flowering plants called the harlequin flowers. It belongs to the iris family Iridaceae with about 13 species endemic to Cape Province, South Africa.

All are perennials that grow during the wet winter season, flower in spring and survive underground as dormant corms over summer. Their conspicuous flowers have six tepals, which in most species are equal in size and shape.

Sparaxis bulbifera has flowers from cream to yellow or purple. Sparaxis grandiflora is a similar but larger plant. In cultivation in the UK it has gained the Royal Horticultural Society’s Award of Garden Merit. Sparaxis tricolor has bright red flowers with yellow and black centres. Many named hybrid cultivars were bred from S. bulbifera and S. tricolor.

A group of species with asymmetrical flowers marked in mauve and yellow, including Sparaxis variegata and Sparaxis villosa, was formerly treated as the genus Synnotia.

The genus name is derived from the Greek word sparasso, meaning "to tear", and alludes to the shape of the floral bracts.

Species

 Sparaxis auriculata Goldblatt & J.C.Manning
 Sparaxis bulbifera (L.) Ker Gawl.
 Sparaxis calcicola Goldblatt & J.C.Manning
 Sparaxis caryophyllacea Goldblatt
 Sparaxis elegans (Sweet) Goldblatt
 Sparaxis fragrans (Jacq.) Ker Gawl.
 Sparaxis galeata Ker Gawl.
 Sparaxis grandiflora  (D.Delaroche) Ker Gawl.
 Sparaxis grandiflora subsp. grandiflora (D.Delaroche) Ker Gawl.
 Sparaxis grandiflora subsp. acutiloba Goldblatt
 Sparaxis grandiflora subsp. fimbriata (Lam.) Goldblatt
 Sparaxis grandiflora subsp. violacea (Eckl.) Goldblatt
 Sparaxis maculosa Goldblatt
 Sparaxis metelerkampiae (L.Bolus) Goldblatt & J.C.Manning
 Sparaxis parviflora (G.J.Lewis) Goldblatt
 Sparaxis pillansii L.Bolus
 Sparaxis roxburghii (Baker) Goldblatt
 Sparaxis tricolor (Schneev.) Ker Gawl.
 Sparaxis variegata (Sweet) Goldblatt
 Sparaxis villosa (Burm.f.) Goldblatt

References

External links

Goldblatt, P. (1999). Sparaxis. Flora of Southern Africa 7: 151–169.
Flora of North America

Iridaceae genera